is a 1980 Japanese erotic drama film directed by Kazunari Takeda. It was released on 12 April 1980.

Cast
Miyako Yamaguchi
Megumi Ogawa
Kan Mikami
Kōjirō Kusanagi
Renji Ishibashi

Reception
It was chosen as the 7th best film at the 2nd Yokohama Film Festival.

References

1980 drama films
1980 films
1980s erotic drama films
Japanese erotic drama films
Nikkatsu Roman Porno
1980s Japanese films